Anës lumenjve (By the rivers) is a poem in the Albanian language by Fan S. Noli, in which the history of Albania is described. The poem was released in 1928, after Noli himself had been ousted from his position of Prime Minister by Ahmed Zogu's coup, which would later make a monarchy of the country, a republic since its independence in 1912.

The poem is mainly an exile's lamentation for how close the country came to modernisation (the title is thus to be interpreted: most of the rivers along which the action is set are Albanian, yet the country itself is "along" the Elbe and the Spree, that is, next to Central and Western Europe, and it is all the more painful to see it fall short of political, social and cultural maturity as it is an integral part of that continent and culture from which those ideals hail), which leads the narrating voice to a point of despair until, as if a natural phenomenon, he can hear (or, rather, predict), the people rising up in arms, as they had when fighting for independence, in order to expel the tyrant (Zog himself insofar as he has throttled the reformist atmosphere of the post-independence period, and all the foreign aims and interests the future King, helped to power by the Yugoslavs and ultimately ousted, in 1939, by the Italians); this expectation, although far from completion, allows the poet to close with the same words as in the beginning, in the same condition, yet in a hopeful, rejuvenated mood.

Notable about the style is a frenetic rhythm, a rich, heterogeneous language and imagery, and a very strong musical frame; the second stanza, especially, is filled with Turkish loanwords, common yet noticeable to an Albanian speaker's ear for their "foreignness", which, so tightly clustered, suggestively hint at the country's recent past as a mere province of a large and indifferent Empire. Also notable is the repetition of the first four lines, minimally altered, at the end, and the way the proximity to the Elbe and the Spree, that is, the West and all hopes of modernisation, is a source for grief to the desperate exile of the poem's beginning, and yet one more reason for hope and solace once his "faith" in his own countrymen's action is restored.

Poem

See also
Albanian literature

References

Albanian poems